The 1970 Cork Senior Hurling Championship was the 82nd staging of the Cork Senior Hurling Championship since its establishment by the Cork County Board in 1887. The championship began on 19 April 1970 and ended on 22 November 1970.

Glen Rovers entered the championship as the defending champions, however, they were defeated by University College Cork in the quarter-final.

The final was played on 22 November 1970 at the Athletic Grounds in Cork, between University College Cork and Muskerry, in what was their first ever meeting in a final. University College Cork won the match by 2-12 to 0-15 to claim their second championship title overall and a first title in seven years.

Muskerry's Tomás Ryan was the championship's top scorer with 0-38.

Team changes

To Championship

Promoted from the Cork Intermediate Hurling Championship
 Youghal

Results

First round

Quarter-finals

Semi-finals

Final

Championship statistics

Top scorers

Top scorer overall

Top scorers in a single game

Miscellaneous

 Muskerry qualified for the final for the first time in their history.
 Muskerry miss out on the double having won the 1970 Cork Senior Football Championship.

References

Cork Senior Hurling Championship
Cork Senior Hurling Championship